A referendum on the presidency of Ali Soilih was held in the Comoros on 28 October 1977. The result was 56.63% in favour and 43.37% against, with a 92.2% voter turnout. Despite the backing, Soilih was overthrown on 13 May 1978 by forces hired by exiled former leader Ahmed Abdallah, who was restored to power.

Results

References

1977 referendums 
1977 
1977 in the Comoros
1977